Barre Denis is a second-order administrative division in Castries District on the island nation of Saint Lucia.  It has a population of 699.  The town within Barre Denis is called Berre Denis.  Barre Densis  is located at the northern end of the island towards its heart, between Deglos and Tourat.

See also
List of cities in Saint Lucia
Castries District

References

Towns in Saint Lucia